Vlasikha is the name of several inhabited localities in Russia.

Urban localities
Vlasikha, Moscow Oblast, a closed work settlement in Moscow Oblast

Rural localities
Vlasikha (station), Altai Krai, a station in Vlasikhinskaya Settlement Administration of Industrialny City District of the city of krai significance of Barnaul, Altai Krai
Vlasikha (selo), Altai Krai, a selo in Vlasikhinskaya Settlement Administration of Industrialny City District of the city of krai significance of Barnaul, Altai Krai
Vlasikha, Kostroma Oblast, a village in Ivanovskoye Settlement of Sharyinsky District of Kostroma Oblast
Vlasikha, Novgorod Oblast, a village in Peredskoye Settlement of Borovichsky District of Novgorod Oblast
Vlasikha, Molokovsky District, Tver Oblast, a village in Molokovsky District of Tver Oblast
Vlasikha, Rameshkovsky District, Tver Oblast, a village in Rameshkovsky District of Tver Oblast
Vlasikha, Yaroslavl Oblast, a village in Rozhalovsky Rural Okrug of Nekouzsky District of Yaroslavl Oblast